This is a list of the past and present mayors of Everett, Massachusetts.

References

Everett